Deeper Throat is a Showtime reality TV show in which Vivid Entertainment owner Steven Hirsch stages a full-court press to persuade the owner of the porn classic Deep Throat to sell him the remake rights.

References

External links

 Ep 1 details - Showtime's website

2000s American reality television series
English-language television shows
Showtime (TV network) original programming
2009 American television series debuts
2009 American television series endings